José María Luengo Martínez (1896–1991) was a Spanish writer and archaeologist. He was born in Astorga on May 17, 1896 and died in A Coruña in 1991. He was the son of Crescencio Luengo and Maria Dolores Martinez and was baptized in the parish of San Bartolome de Astorga (León).

References

1896 births
1991 deaths
20th-century Spanish archaeologists